Liviu Mihai (born 17 May 1977 in Cluj-Napoca, Cluj County) is a retired Romanian professional football player.

External links
 
 

1977 births
Living people
Sportspeople from Cluj-Napoca
Romanian footballers
Liga I players
FCV Farul Constanța players
FC Universitatea Cluj players
SCM Râmnicu Vâlcea players
CS Pandurii Târgu Jiu players
Association football forwards